Sauveur is French for "savior" and is also a family name.

Sauveur may refer to:

Saint Savour 
Saint-Sauveur (disambiguation)

As a name 
Albert Sauveur (1863–1939), American metallurgist
Joseph Sauveur (1653–1716), French mathematician
Rich Sauveur (born 1963), American baseball player